The Lost Abbey Brewing Company is a brewery in San Marcos, run by Director of Brewery Operations Tomme Arthur.  The Lost Abbey specializes in producing Belgian-inspired beers, barrel-aged beers, and sours.  The Lost Abbey is co-located with Port Brewing Company in a facility that previously housed Stone Brewing Co.

Beers

Year-Round Beers

Seasonal Beers
Seasonal beers include:

Non-Denominational Beers

Awards
The Lost Abbey beers have won multiple awards at various festivals, including the annual Great American Beer Festival and World Beer Cup
 2007: Small Brewery of the Year at The Great American Beer Festival: Specialty Beer (gold), Wood and Barrel Aged Sour (gold) and Experimental Beer (silver)
 2008: Champion Small Brewery and Brewer at The World Beer Cup
 2009: Belgian and French Style Ale (gold) and Belgian-style Lambic or Sour Ale (gold) at The Great American Beer Festival
 2010: American Style Sour Ale (bronze) at The Great American Beer Festival
 2012: Belgian and French Style Ale (gold), American Style Stout (silver), Experimental Beer (bronze) at The Great American Beer Festival
 2012: French and Belgian Saison category (gold) and French and Belgian Ale category (gold) at The World Beer Cup
 2013: Champion Brewery at The San Diego International Beer Competition and Festival

See also
 California breweries

References

External links 
Lost Abbey

Beer brewing companies based in San Diego County, California
Companies based in San Diego County, California
San Marcos, California